The Moscow electoral district was a constituency created for the 1917 Russian Constituent Assembly election. The electoral district covered the Moscow Governorate, except for the city of Moscow.

According to the account of U.S. historian Oliver Henry Radkey, which constitutes the source for the results table below, only few votes were missing from the summary (one military voting box in Moscow uezd, the votes from a single volost in Bronnitsy uezd and the votes for smaller parties in Serpukhov uezd).

Results

References

Electoral districts of the Russian Constituent Assembly election, 1917
Moscow Governorate